Calamus Creek is a minor tributary of the Beaver Dam River, about  long, in southeastern Wisconsin in the United States. Via the Beaver Dam, Crawfish, and Rock rivers, it is part of the watershed of the Mississippi River. Its watershed lies almost entirely within Dodge County with a small portion in neighboring Columbia County.

Course
Calamus Creek rises in west central Dodge County near the intersection of Mt. Pleasant and Van Buren roads and follows a highly winding, generally easterly course through Dodge County.

The relatively small watershed, contained mostly within the town of Calamus, is entirely rural with no cities or villages. U.S. Route 151 passes through it, as well as the Adams subdivision of the Union Pacific Railroad.

Geography
The region is predominantly agricultural, with some wetlands, grassland, and forested areas. The Wisconsin DNR labels the landtype as the Beaver Dam drumlins, a land formation marked by till plains and terminal moraines created during the Wisconsin Ice Age: "the characteristic landform pattern is rolling till plain with drumlins and scattered muck deposits. Soils are predominantly well drained silt over calcareous sandy loam till." The original vegetation cover is primarily white oak, black oak, bur oak, marsh and sedge meadow, wet prairie, and lowland shrubs.

Calamus Creek is part of the larger Upper Rock River Basin. The  of the streams comprising the Calamus Creek watershed cover , or 19315 acres, with 54.39 acres covered by five unnamed lakes and 3627.39 acres of wetlands.

Conservation
The watershed includes extensive wetlands, some of which are in the process of restoration. Parts of Calamus Creek are designated wadable nursery waters for smallmouth bass by the Wisconsin DNR, but the creek's rated condition for fish and aquatic life is poor as of 2010. Its entire course is also listed as impaired due to nonpoint sources, mostly sediment and suspended solids. This signifies that the water quality does not allow the creek to meet its designated use, necessitating a water quality improvement plan. The creek's total maximum daily load planning is still in development. Additionally, Dodge County has been granted both a Large Scale Lake Planning Grant and Lake Protection Grant which includes the county's majority portion of the Calamus Creek watershed. There are several DNR managed lands, including two areas of glacial habitat restoration.

See also
List of rivers of Wisconsin

References

Rivers of Wisconsin
Rivers of Dodge County, Wisconsin
Tributaries of the Mississippi River
Rivers of Columbia County, Wisconsin